Habit is a 1921 American silent drama film directed by Edwin Carewe and written by Madge Tyrone based upon a play by Tom Barry. The film starred Mildred Harris.

Cast
Mildred Harris as Irene Fletcher
W. E. Lawrence as John Marshall (credited as William Lawrence)
Ethel Grey Terry as Mary Chartres
Walter McGrail as Charles Munson
Emmett King as Richard Fletcher (credited as Emmet C. King)

References

External links

Stills from the production;#1, #2 (University of Washington, Sayre Collection)
Glass slides at IMDb.com

1921 films
American silent feature films
Films directed by Edwin Carewe
1921 drama films
Silent American drama films
Films produced by Louis B. Mayer
American black-and-white films
1920s American films